Arjuna Phalguna is a 2021 Indian Telugu-language crime comedy film written and directed by Teja Marni. It stars Sree Vishnu, Amritha Aiyer and Gaurav Pareek. The film released theatrically on 31 December 2021.

Plot
In a small village in East Godavari, a pose of five friends, Arjun, Ram Babu, Thadodu, Oscar and Shravani are close knit and share everything.

The main lead Arjun is a Jr NTR fan. He prefers to stay in his native village and work for less money than going to big cities and earning. He stays with his parents and helps his father run his dairy business.

One day bank tries to seize Thadodu's house and on request of their Village Sarpanch and who is also a private lender the bank manager gives some more time. But the manager requests a bribe to manage the situation then Arjun was forced to give away his favourite cow as the guarantee to Naresh by lending money of Rs.50,000 to give bribe.

Arjun having a good expertise in making a perfect soda later decides to start his own soda business with his friends and applies for the loan but the bank manager asks for a bribe of Rs.50,000.

Arjun and his friends get the offer from their childhood rival Vamsi now a rural Croupier to earn the required money to free the house as well as the money required for the bribe by transferring Cannabis. Though reluctant at first they agree to the terms because of their dire needs.

The transfer does not go well and a corrupt but appears as a strict police officer Subba Raju "Subbu" chases them. However Arjun and his gang successfully escapes from his clutches with the unexpected help of Sravani. Finally they reaches Andhra-Orissa Border to transfer the cannabis but they learned that the bags had been swapped with Subbu in the chase which found the money which worth Rs.50lakhs. Then the gang tries to steel the amount from them a fight ensues and with a hard struggle they escapes to Vizag. There they caught again the Cops who are Subbu's loyalists and the smugglers gang. But Arjun acts smart by fooling them as showing an opposite member to each other and escapes to their Village. After knowing the facts Subbu teams up with the smugglers and become headbound to catch Arjun and his friends.

After reaching their village they hides the bag in a haystack started to wait for their chance to give the money. Meanwhile, they learned that the Sarpanch's daughter Sunita is going to marry Subbu so they decided to not go in front of him. Later the bank manager came to seize Thadodu's house by saying the given time has end. Then Arjun went to take the money but to their shock the haystack was burned in front of them and entire money has been burned. All hopes have left the gang decided to do work in the city. One last time Arjun meets his favourite cow secretly their he sees the real face of Sarpanch. It is revealed that the Bank manager is the partner in crime of the Sarpanch who decided to grab the villagers lands by getting cheaply. By making them believe the villagers as a good man he lends the loan with a low interest rates to the villagers for paying the bank loans whenever they cannot pay the installment. At the same time he made a deal with manager that he will buy the seized lands cheaply from the bank who privately gives some commission to the manager to get hold off. Sarpanch knows well that the poor farmers like Thadodu can't pay their loan back it is easy to grab such properties from them and started their scam.

After knowing the facts Arjun threatens the Sarpanch to reveal his real face to the village then no option left Sarpanch comes to bargain on thinking that his son-in-law is very strict if the facts were known to him it will become a problem to his family prestige. Then Arjun bargains the lands who grabbed by him need to give back to villagers. The Sarpanch obeys to give back except Thadodu's home because he reveals that he had given that property to Subbu as a dowry. Then Arjun first time faces Subbu threatens by showing his secret video who got along with the money in the chase and kept for himself to protect themselves. Subbu intentions reveals to their chase that actually Subbu organizing an Animal trade by joining hands with the forest welfare minister of the state. A journalist who records all his activities and demands ransom to him but he was caught and arrested in a cheating case by Subbu. Unfortunately the facts and money were swapped with the Cannabis bag. Then no option left Subbu comes to Arjun knees to bargain on thinking of that his father-in-law is a sincere man. Then Arjun orders to give Thadodu's land as a gentle way. Then as per the plan ends well. Later in a news headline Arjun learns that the Subbu arrested Vamsi for exchanging the fake notes and is promoted. It reveals that the amount is filled with fake notes when Arjun hiding the bag Vamsi sees it and thefts the entire money and burns the haystack.

The film ends on a happy note with friends discussing the upcoming film RRR.

Cast 
 Sree Vishnu as Arjuna
 Amritha Aiyer as Sravani
 Naresh as Village Sarpanch
 Sivaji Raja as Arjuna's father
 Subbaraju as DFO Subbaraju
 Devi Prasad as Thadodu's father
 Rangasthalam Mahesh as Thadodu
 Dayanand Reddy
 Gaurav Pareek
 Chaitanya Garikipati as Rambabu
 Rajkumar Kasireddy as Oscar

Soundtrack 
The soundtrack album features eight songs.

Release

Theatrical
The film was released on 31 December 2021, New Year's Eve.

Home media
The film began streaming on Aha on 26 January 2022.

Reception 
Y. Sunitha Chowdhary of The Hindu appreciated Vishnu's performance but opined the film was let down by a weak story. "With no chemistry between the lead pair, hardly any emotional heft, a comedy that falls flat and cinematography that doesn't impress, the film is not engaging," Chowdhary added. Sakshi critic Anji Shetty who rated the film 2/5 stars also felt the same. Shetty criticized the film's poor direction and routine storyline. Siddartha Toleti of Mirchi9 rated the film 1.75 stars of 5 and criticised the Direction, Screenplay, Weak Story, Overdramatic and Logic less scenes Sequences but praised Some Emotional Moments. "Clueless Direction" Toleti added.

A reviewer from Eenadu compared the film with warrior Arjuna who was trapped in Padmavyuha owing to its weak screenplay and lackluster climax. 123telugu.com concluded its review by stating "On the whole, Arjuna Phalguna is a silly and over-the-top crime drama that fails to entertain. The slow pace and logic less narration make this film a boring watch. Except for Sree Vishnu's sincere performance, this film has nothing much to offer."

References

External links 

 

2021 films
2020s Telugu-language films
Films set in Konaseema
Films shot in Andhra Pradesh
Films set in Andhra Pradesh
Films set in Visakhapatnam
Films shot in Visakhapatnam
Indian crime comedy films
2020s crime comedy films